Raynald was a Benedictine monk and Bishop of Nocera Umbra. Born around 1150, in the village of Postignano, near Nocera Umbra, Italy, to parents of German descent.

He entered the Benedictine congregation of Fonte Avellana. He was at the monastery of S. Maria di Vallemergo in 1199, along with Trasimundus, the future bishop of Senigallia. He was elected Prior of the monastery of Santa Croce di Fonte Avellana, though the date is unknown. On 7 February 1218 Prior Rinaldo and his monastery were taken under the protection of the Holy See by Pope Honorius III, renewing the privilege granted by Pope Innocent II in 1139. In 1218, he accompanied Bishop Gerard of Ancona and Bishop Trasimundus of Senigallia to Fano, to negotiate the release of the imprisoned Bishop Riccardo. In September 1218, he visited the monastery of S. Esuperanzio in Cingoli, where he acted as witness to a grant to the monastery. He then visited Senigallia, where his congregation received a gift, and finally returned to his own monastery at Fonte Avellano.

He was appointed Bishop of Nocera Umbra in 1213. He was a close friend of St. Francis of Assisi. He was one of the seven bishops who consecrated the church of the Porziuncula at Assisi, and proclaimed the indulgence. He served as Bishop of Nocera until his death in 1217.

References

Bibliography

German Roman Catholic saints
Italian Roman Catholic saints
13th-century Christian saints
1217 deaths
1150s births
13th-century Italian Roman Catholic bishops
Italian Benedictines